Secret Communications was a radio broadcasting company formed by the April 1994 merger of Booth American Company and Broadcast Alchemy. The firm was headed by venture capitalist and WEBN's 1st ever DJ and Program Director himself, Frank Wood Jr. a.k.a. Dr. Michael Bo Xanadu of the "Jelly Pudding" show. It was Frank who christened the name "Secret" was created as a joke, and was acquired by SFX Broadcasting, and, eventually, Clear Channel after its purchase of Capstar/AMFM.

External links

The rise of Secret

Defunct radio broadcasting companies of the United States